Håvard Tvedten (born 29 June 1978) is a retired Norwegian handball player, who last played for the Danish club Aalborg Håndbold.

He started his club career in Stord TIL, and later played for AaB Håndbold.

He made his debut on the Norwegian national team in 2000, and played 208 matches and scored 809 goals.

Individual awards
 All-Star Left wing of the World Championship: 2011

References

External links
Profile at the Norwegian Handball Association (Retrieved on 4 August 2008)

1978 births
Living people
Norwegian male handball players
Norwegian expatriate sportspeople in Spain
Liga ASOBAL players
BM Valladolid players
Aalborg Håndbold players